No Quarter is a live album by Jimmy Page and Robert Plant, both formerly of English rock band Led Zeppelin. It was released by Atlantic Records on 14 October 1994. The long-awaited reunion between Jimmy Page and Robert Plant occurred on a 90-minute "UnLedded" MTV project, recorded in Morocco, Wales, and London. It was not a reunion of Led Zeppelin, however, as former bassist and keyboardist John Paul Jones was not present. In fact, Jones was not even told about the reunion by his former bandmates. He later commented that he was unhappy about Plant and Page naming the album after "No Quarter", a Led Zeppelin song which was largely his work.

In addition to acoustic renditions, the album features a reworking of Led Zeppelin songs featuring a Moroccan string band and Egyptian orchestra supplementing a core group of rock and roll musicians, along with four Middle-Eastern and Moroccan-influenced songs: "City Don't Cry", "Yallah" (or "The Truth Explodes"), "Wonderful One", and "Wah Wah".

The album was #4 on debut on the Billboard's Pop Albums chart.

Several years later, Plant reflected on the collaboration very positively:

Legacy
In July 2014, Guitar World placed No Quarter on their "Superunknown: 50 Iconic Albums That Defined 1994" list.

Track listing 

For the tenth anniversary, the album was re-released with a different cover and altered track listing. "Thank You" was cut, "City Don't Cry" and "Wonderful One" appeared in substantially edited versions, and "The Rain Song" and "Wah Wah" were added. In addition, "Yallah" was retitled, and several other tracks had minor alterations to their running times. The new running order was as follows:

"Gallows Pole" and "Wonderful One" were released as singles.

All songs recorded in London except "City Don't Cry", "Wah Wah" and "Yallah" recorded in Morocco; "No Quarter", "Nobody's Fault But Mine" and "When the Levee Breaks" recorded in Wales.

DVD release 

The tenth anniversary of the recording of the Unledded concerts was commemorated by a DVD release of additional songs, a bonus interview, a montage of images from Morocco, the band's performance of "Black Dog" for Dick Clark's American Music Awards and the music video for "Most High" from the Walking into Clarksdale album. The songs included on the DVD release not included on either CD release were "What Is and What Should Never Be" and "When the Levee Breaks". To compensate for their absence from the Live Aid DVD release, Plant and Page donated a portion of their proceeds to the Band Aid Trust.

DVD track listing 
 "No Quarter" (Jones/Page/Plant)
 "Thank You"
 "What Is And What Should Never Be"
 "The Battle of Evermore"
 "Gallows Pole" (Traditional arr. Page/Plant)
 "Nobody's Fault but Mine"
 "City Don't Cry"
 "The Truth Explodes" (formerly known as "Yallah") (Page/Plant)
 "Wah Wah"
 "When the Levee Breaks"
 "Wonderful One"
 "Since I've Been Loving You" (Jones/Page/Plant)
 "The Rain Song"
 "That's the Way"
 "Four Sticks"
 "Friends"
 "Kashmir" (Page/Plant/Bonham)

Bonus material
 "Black Dog" (performed at the ABC American Music Awards)
 Moroccan Montage
 "Most High" music video
 Interview

Personnel 

The songs were recorded in Marrakech, Morocco (spring 1994), on top of a waste tip at Aberllefenni quarries (17 August 1994), and in a forest in Wales; and in front of an invited audience at London Weekend Television studios over two nights in August, 1994 .

 Robert Plant – vocals 
 Jimmy Page – acoustic and electric guitars, mandolin

Musicians in Marrakech (except on Yallah)

 Brahim El Balkani

 Hassan El Arfaoui
 El Mahjoub El Mathoun
 Abdelkah Eddahmane

London and Wales band (except on No Quarter, Wonderful One)

 Charlie Jones – bass guitar, percussion 
 Michael Lee – drums, percussion
 Porl Thompson – guitar, banjo
 Jim Sutherland – mandolin, bodhrán
 Nigel Eaton – Hurdy-gurdy 

 Ed Shearmur – Hammond organ, orchestral arrangements for English and Egyptian Ensemble (London only)
 Najma Akhtar – vocals (London only)

Egyptian Ensemble (London)

Percussion
 Hossam Ramzy – doholla, musical director for Egyptian Ensemble
 Ali Abdel Salem – duf, bendir
 Farid Khashab – bendir, reque
 Farouk El Safi – duf, bendir
 Ibrahim Abdel Khaliq – bendir, mirwas, finger cymbals

Strings
 Waeil Abu Bakr – soloist
 Bahig Mikhaeel
 Hanafi Soliman
 Amin Abdel Azim
Also
 Bashir Abdel Aal – ney
 Abdel Salam Kheir – oud

London Metropolitan Orchestra (London)

Violins
 Rosemary Furniss
 David Juritz
 Rita Manning
 Elizabeth Layton
 Ian Humphries
 Perry Montague-Mason
 Mark Berrow
 Pauline Lowbury
 Clare Thompson
 Jessica O'Leary
 David Ogden
 Peter Hanson
 Jeremy Williams
 Cathy Thompson
 Ed Coxon
 Anne Morlee
 Harriet Davies

Violas
 Andrew Brown
 Rusen Gunes
 Andrew Parker
 Bill Hawkes
 Nicholas Pendlebery
 John Jezard
 Janet Atkins

Celli
 Caroline Dale
 Cathy Giles
 Stephen Milne
 Ben Chappell 
 Jonathan Tunnel

Also
 Sandy Lawson – didjeridu
 Storme Watson – didjeridu

Production 

 Jimmy Page –  producer
 Robert Plant –  producer
 Mike Gregovich –  engineer, mixing
 Martin Meissonnier –  percussion pre-production on "Yallah (The Truth Explodes)" and "Wonderful One"
 Andy Earl –  photography
 Cally –  design
 Kevin Shirley –  remixed stereo and surround sound for 2004 edition

Accolades

Charts

Weekly charts

Year-end charts

Video

Certifications

References 

Page and Plant albums
Albums produced by Jimmy Page
1994 live albums
2004 video albums
Live video albums
Atlantic Records live albums
Atlantic Records video albums
Rhino Records live albums
Rhino Records video albums
Fontana Records live albums
Fontana Records video albums
Covers albums
MTV Unplugged albums